Valmiki Temple is a Hindu temple dedicated to Valmiki in Lahore, Pakistan. The temple is managed and maintained by the Pakistan Hindu Council and Evacuee Trust Property Board. In the contemporary era, the Krishna Temple and the Valmiki Temple are the only two functional Hindu temples in Lahore.

See also
 Hinduism in Pakistan
 Hinduism in Punjab, Pakistan

References 

Hindu temples in Lahore
Shrines in Lahore
2006 in Pakistan
Political history of Pakistan
History of Lahore (1947–present)

Hindu temples in Punjab, Pakistan